The 14th season of the television series Arthur was originally broadcast on PBS in the United States from October 11, 2010 to April 29, 2011, and contains 10 episodes. Season 14 began screening at Israel in late August 2010 and on ABC2 of Australia on September 27, 2010. It has also screened in United Kingdom on CBBC since November 1, 2010. The second half started on Earth Day 2011 and ended the day before the Royal Wedding the next day.

Episodes

Australian air dates
Season 14 began screening on the Australian Broadcasting Corporation's iView service and ABC2 on September 27, 2010. The episode order does not agree with the list above, instead being listed in the series' original production order. The episodes that didn't air in the U.S. from October 2010 to April 2011 were aired as season 15.

Production
In September 2009, Cookie Jar Group confirmed production of this season and 185 episodes by 2010. Like season 12, this season produced 20 episodes for the broadcast span of two years (or television seasons). Because of this, many countries outside of the U.S. released the episodes earlier than scheduled for PBS.

Additionally, overseas this was the first season to be produced in 1080i HD (the previous two seasons were aired in widescreen in some markets but were still produced in 480i regardless of the aspect ratio), and was the first season to use previews for the episode on the title cards instead of the animated ones. In the US, the show continued to be aired in 480i and in the 4:3 aspect ratio, and still used the animated title cards up until season 16.

All Kids Can Character Search
In January 2009, WGBH and CVS Caremark announced a character design contest for children aged 6 – 12. The contest was designed to educate children about the importance of inclusion and how children of all abilities can play together. Entries required an illustration and description of a character with a disability. Jacqui Deegan, senior director of Arthur comments, "We're looking for an exciting new character, who can show the gang in Elwood City that children come in all shapes, sizes and abilities. Over the years, ARTHUR has helped children to embrace other kids' unique characteristics as well as their own, and this new character will continue that tradition." The contest ran from February 1, 2009, to March 31, 2009, and the winner was announced in June 2009. Connor Gordon's character, Lydia Fox, was featured on the season premiere, "The Wheel Deal."

References

General references 

 

 

2010 American television seasons
2011 American television seasons
Arthur (TV series) seasons
2011 Canadian television seasons
2010 Canadian television seasons